All I Want is the first solo studio album by The Reverb Junkie – producer moniker for musician Michelle Chamuel. The album was self-produced and released on September 10, 2013. The album debuted at number 6 on the U.S. Dance/Electronic Albums chart. A music video of the album's title track "All I Want" was released following the album's release. An album review called the music progressive.

Composition 

Chamuel called the album her "solo electronic project" and said it is quite different from anything she had done before. In describing the compositions, she wrote:

For this album, I wrote and recorded full songs, then went back and selected my favorite parts – significant words/notes/syllables/etc – and left only those parts. I got to use my voice as an instrument and play with the different sounds it can make. I wrote melodies on bass, piano, strings, synthesizer, guitar, organ, and glockenspiel. I acted like my own choir. I programmed drums [...] I kept writing and re-arranging, adding and taking away, until it sounded just how I wanted it to.

The original uncut demo of three of the songs were released as tracks 12 through 14. The male vocals are Chamuel's voice processed electronically. In an interview following the album's release, Chamuel said her studio work as The Reverb Junkie focuses on creative sound works, and it is not necessarily performative on stage. She compared the creative process to painting and sculpting with sound, where melodies are shaped as new layers are added. Regarding the album's name, she said it reflects "what I've wanted to make for a long time".

Track listing

Personnel 
Credits adapted from Bandcamp music store.

 The Reverb Junkie – composer, arranger, performer, engineer, producer, artwork 
 Tyler Duncan – stem mixing, mastering

Charts

References

2013 albums
Michelle Chamuel albums